Days of the New (also known as the Orange or Yellow album) is the debut album of alternative rock band Days of the New, and the first of their three self-titled albums. The album was released in 1997 through Outpost Records.

Production
The band recorded its debut album in October and November 1996 at Woodland Studios in Nashville, Tennessee. Drummer Matt Taul was called away from the studio during the sessions for the birth of his daughter, so session drummer Adam Turgeon filled in on some tracks.

Travis Meeks named Dead Can Dance as an inspiration while working on the album.

The last song on the album, "Cling" is actually a home demo that Meeks recorded on a four-track machine. The entire album is acoustic, with emphasis on guitar, and features dark melodies such as "Face of the Earth" and "Freak" as well as more up-tempo songs like "The Down Town" and "Where I Stand."

Promotion
Days of the New was a success, selling 1.5 million copies worldwide. Three songs from the album were hits: "Touch, Peel and Stand," "The Down Town," and "Shelf in the Room." "Touch, Peel and Stand" was number one on Billboard's Rock Chart for 17 weeks; "The Down Town" and "Shelf in the Room" were each top 40 hits. Music videos produced for the three singles also found rotation.

Shortly after releasing the album, the band went on tour with Metallica and Jerry Cantrell in 1998. Internal problems became publicly evident, however, and soon after concluding the tour, the band split up. Todd Whitener, Matt Taul and Jesse Vest would go on to form Tantric while Meeks formed a new band under the Days of the New name.

Critical reception 
Reviewing for The Village Voice in December 1997, Robert Christgau was unenthusiastic about the album: "As marketing, pure genius. Looks like alt-country, no electric guitars even, yet is actually America's answer to Silverchair. And hey, it's sincere—17-year-old heartland frontman Travis Meeks really is depressed, really has immersed in Soundgarden, really does think it's deep to hook your single to the all-purpose trope 'abuse.' This is why grownups need Hanson. It's also why they need Radish."

Stephen Thomas Earliwine was more complimentary, giving the album three out of five stars. He said Meeks's vocals and lyrics were occasionally disappointing, but the album's stronger moments "prove that teenagers can rock as hard, and with as much purpose, as adults."

Track listing

Outtakes and B-Sides 

 "Independent Slaves" - Appears on the Touch, Peel and Stand single and on the Crow: Salvation soundtrack
 "Got to Be You" - Appears on the Touch, Peel and Stand single and on 2 Guitars, Bass & Drums: Songs For Survival
 "Special Guide" - Appears on the Shelf In The Room single
 "The Character/The Threat" - Appears on the Days of the New: Live VHS
 "Break You" - Played during the Fall 1997 tour
 "I Tried" Unreleased song

Personnel 
Adapted credits from the Days of the New booklet. Drum credits as per Meeks' official biography.

Days of the New
 Travis Meeks - lead vocals, rhythm guitar 
 Todd Whitener - lead guitar, backing vocals
 Jesse Vest - bass
 Matt Taul - drums ("Touch, Peel, and Stand", "Whimsical", "Freak", "Now")

Additional musicians
 Todd Smith - keyboards
 Adam Turgeon - drums ("Shelf in the Room", "The Down Town", "Solitude", "What’s Left For Me?", "Face of the Earth", "How Do You Know You?", "Where I Stand")

Artwork
 Chris Bilheimer - Art direction, illustrations, photography
 Jim Goldberg - Photography

Production
Travis Meeks - Producer
 Bill Klatt - Producer, engineer
 Scott Litt - Producer
 Todd Smith & Chris Stone - Second engineers
 Blair Wells - Digital editing
 Bob Ludwig - Mastering
 James Rosenthal - Mixing
 Adam Green - Digital editing

Charts

Album

Singles

Certifications

Days of the New: Live
On December 1, 1998, Outpost released Days of the New: Live, a VHS featuring concert footage and two music videos. The video includes numerous songs that would be released on future Days of the New albums.

Track listing
 Fighting with Clay
 Freak
 Best in Life
 Shelf in the Room
 The Character/The Threat
 Face of the Earth
 Special Guide
 How Do You Know You?
 Touch, Peel and Stand
 Bring Yourself
 The Down Town
 Touch, Peel and Stand (video)
 Shelf in the Room (video)

References 

1997 debut albums
Albums produced by Scott Litt
Days of the New albums